Nomad Songs is the 23rd studio album by the German world musician Stephan Micus. The album was released in June 2015 through ECM Records. Like all of his albums, it was produced by Micus himself, unlike most of the other records on the ECM label, which are produced by label boss Manfred Eicher.

Composition
Stephan Micus is always seeking to find new traditional instruments. He learned their history and how to play. Then he composes new music and plays all of these traditional instruments on albums. On Nomad Songs, he plays two new instruments, a genbri (a Moroccan lute) and a ndingo (a Botswanan lamellophone).

Reception
John Kelman in his review for All About Jazz gave a four and a half stars and says that "Nomad Songs is, despite the perennially pensive and reflective nature of his entire body of work, a shift from the more conceptually focused Panagia, which was based around prayers to the Virgin Mary."

Track listing

Personnel
Stephan Micus – ndingo, genbri, steel-string guitar, suling, voice, ney, rawap, rebab, twelve-string guitar, fourteen-string guitar, tin whistle, shakuhachi

References

Stephan Micus albums
ECM Records albums
2015 albums